Dameo is an abstract strategy board game for two players invented by Christian Freeling in 2000. It is a variant of the game draughts (or checkers) and is played on an 8×8 checkered gameboard.

Game rules 
Dameo is played on an 8×8 checkerboard with 18 pieces per player. Each player's pieces are arranged so that the bottom three rows, from the perspective of the player, are filled from a1 to h1, b2 to g2, and c3 to f3, forming a distinctive trapezoid shape.

History 
Dameo has its origins in Christian Freeling's 1988 game Bushka, inspired by the traditional Madagascar game Fanorona. Freeling describes his first experience with Fanorona as a "shock," and he felt the game to be very volatile on the whole. Fanorona's capture methods of approach and withdrawal, however, struck him as being unique among Alquerque derived games, which generally feature capture by jumping over pieces. While capture by withdrawal seemed uninviting, capture by approach left an impression on him and he began thinking of ways to incorporate it into a draughts framework. At first the translation was straightforward, and Bushka was essentially International draughts with a 9x11 board size and capture by approach or "contact." Freeling found this to be functional, but uninspiring due to the need for connected vacant squares to achieve more complicated multi-capture moves.  

He returned to Fanorona which allows a single man to capture whole lines of men by its capture method rather than just a single man. This allows a player to "...carve deeper into an opponent's position..." and achieve similar capturing power to multicapture moves in draughts, but it didn't sit right with Freeling due to the oddity of "...one man axing a whole phalanx." He let the idea sit for awhile before coming up with the concept of Linear movement and capture, where whole lines of two or men move and capture together as a phalanx. He says that, in retrospect, it was an obvious choice to " ...let the capture of a line of men be by a line of men." This development largely led to the completion of Bushka as it stands today lacking only the later reversion to the 10x10 board and a starting count of 15 men. 

Like capture by approach, the linear movement mechanic inspired  Freeling to look at incorporating it into other games. His first attempt was similar to his attempt with capture by approach, he simply added the concept to International draughts. His reasoning was that it would speed up the game, allowing for quicker entry into the mid and late game. The way it worked out however was largely to create gridlock and slow down the game considerably as it added "defensive" capabilities to both sides without adding any compensating offense. Freeling eventually abandoned the concept in draughts until 15 years later when he encountered Croda. 

Croda was invented in 1995 by Ljuban Dedić of Croatia, Associate Professor of Mathematics at the University of Split and the 1989 International Checkers champion of the former Yugoslavia.  A variant of Turkish draughts, Croda was the result of a search for a checkers variant with the smallest percentage of draws. In it Ljuban Dedić replaced the sideways movement of the man in Turkish draughts with a diagonally forwards movement and filled the back rank with men for a total of 24 compared to Turkish draughts' 16. He also replaced Turkish draught's rule of removal of captured pieces during a turn with removal of captured pieces at the end of the turn.

Croda inspired Freeling to apply his concept of linear movement to a draughts game.

Since its creation Dameo has been featured in an article by Freeling in Abstract Games...for the competitive thinker, has online tournaments on Littlegolem, Brainking, and igGamecenter, and was reviewed by the Belarusian Checkers player Aleh Tapalnitski, who also wrote a book on its strategy.

Strategy 
Dameo differs in tactics and strategies to other draughts/checkers variants due to its double grid and linear movement of men. Familiar concepts such as majority capture, ladders and bridges, and the coup turc are present, along with unique tactics and strategies, such as the Oblique Hit and the King's Trap.

Majority Capture 
Majority Capture is a fundamental part of Dameo. The substance of it is the sacrifice of two or more men in order to manipulate the opponent's position to set up a devastating counterattack. This usually takes the form of board spanning multiple captures for material advantage, but can be for the sake of a positional advantage ending in the promotion to a King as well. Majority capture often plays a role in more specific or localized tactics such as the Ladder Strike, Coup Turc, or Oblique hit.

Ladder and Bridge 
In a ladder strike, the capture resembles moving up or down stairs, as the men are positioned (or forced into a position) where a row of men are lined up diagonally. Clever positioning of your own piece can allow for a majority capture wherein the piece simply "goes up or down the stairs" by alternating capture up (or down) with right or left movement. Setting up this type of majority capture often involves an opponent's piece carelessly placed between two of your own pieces.

A bridge is a simple set up for the ladder strike, where pieces are sacrificed one by one, to position an opponent's man into an ideal position for a ladder strike. They "bridge" the starting position into a winning ladder strike position

Coup Turc 

In Dameo captured men are removed at the end of the turn and not during the turn itself. This, combined with the rule that disallows jumping over the same piece twice, makes the Coup Turc possible. In essence, the tactic is the same as a majority capture, the goal being the manipulation of an opponent's man or king to an advantageous position for a multi-piece capture. The coup turc manages it by forcing an opponent's piece to capture in a sequence ending on a square next to a piece it already captured, lining up perfectly for the player's piece to then counterattack with a majority capture.

Oblique Hit 

The oblique hit combines the rules regarding linear movement and maximum capture. In the diagram on the left, White wins by moving c3 to e5 (bottom left white man to the square just to the right of bottom right black man). Black has two captures available, d5 to f5, capturing the man White just moved, and c5 to e3 capturing the man on c4 and then immediately after the one on d3. However maximum capture takes precedence, so Black must capture the two men on c4 and d3. This leaves White open to capture the black men on d5 and c6 landing one square away from the King's row (c7). If Black moves his man closest to the king's row he will not be able to reach it before White or stop White's other man from reaching the other king's row first.

King's trap 

The king's trap is a defense that takes advantage of Dameo's linear movement. Because of forced capture, if a man lands on the king's row and is crowned, the opponent can, if they have at least four men in a line on the king's row, move the man second closest to the king forward. This forces the king to jump the piece closest to him and land in the empty space directly next to the remaining two men on the king's row, allowing for a counter capture on the next turn. The move is also possible when there is a line of three men ending on the one of the corners.

Another king trap made possible by Dameo is the a1,c1,f1, and h1 configuration (pictured). If a man lands on b1 or g1, then on his next turn, because of maximum capture and the king's long range, he's forced to capture men until he lands on g1 (if he started on b1) or b1 (if he started on g1). This allows the opponent to engage in a counter capture of the king on their turn because of their man in the corner. If the opponent's man lands on either d1 or e1, it leaves him open for immediate capture by the opponent's man on c1 or f1 respectively.

Trivia 
 Nick Bentley, abstract game designer and colleague of Freeling, included Dameo in a list of "The best unpublished modern abstract games."
Aleh Tapalnitski, author of the Meet Dameo! strategy book, has called Dameo Freeling's "attempt to perfect checkers".
Tapalnitski suggests that the properties of the Dameo kings means that two kings will always win against one king and results in Dameo having "very few draws". Stevener Tavener's AiAi artificial intelligence program played ~100,000 games of Dameo against itself and estimated a draw margin of around 21% at high-level play.
 Dameo's game tree complexity is estimated to be around 10^107. Its upper bound state-space complexity is ~10^40.
 Freeling features Dameo as one of his core six games on his website.

See also
 Armenian draughts
 Hexdame

Notes

References

Bibliography

Further reading

External links
 Official website MindSports.nl
 Zillions of Games Dameo implementation by Ed van Zon
 
 Big Dameo, a Dameo variant using a 10x10 board

Abstract strategy games
Board games
Board games introduced in 2000
Draughts variants